Laag is a 1998 Pakistani action crime drama serial, run by PTV between 1998 and 2000. Its story was based on the issues of Kashmir and mostly shot in Pakistan administered part of Kashmir. Serial was written, directed and produced by Rauf Khalid.

Plot 
Huraira is a child from a family which struggles to get by in Indian Administered Kashmir. In an attack planned by JKLF area commander Ghulam Butt, all of Huraira's siblings are killed. Huraira is lucky enough to escape and is found by a Hindu couple. The couple raise him as "Kailash", and he leaves his former life behind. However, he is haunted by his past when he grows into a man and witnesses hostile elements in the state.

Cast 
 Rauf Khalid as Kailash Agarwal/Huraira
 Zeba Bakhtiar as Bisaal Indaraabi
 Nadia Khan as Safia
 Fareedullah as Waleed Abdullah
 Azra Aftab as Zubaida
 Sohail Asghar as Ghulam Butt / Kaku Lala
 Nayyar Ejaz as Major Kalidas
 Naima Khan as Riffat Ara
 Nirma as Squadern Leader Sheetal Kaali Das
 Rashid Mehmood as Moomal
 Lateef Arshad

See also 
 Pakistan Television Corporation
 List of television programmes broadcast by PTV

References

External links 
 Watch PTV dramas

Urdu-language television shows
Pakistani crime television series
Pakistani drama television series
Pakistan Television Corporation original programming
Pakistani action television series
1998 Pakistani television series debuts
2000 Pakistani television series endings
1990s Pakistani television series
2000s Pakistani television series
Indian Armed Forces in fiction
Television shows set in Jammu and Kashmir
Kashmir conflict in fiction
India–Pakistan relations in popular culture